The 2020 United States Senate election in Massachusetts was held on November 3, 2020, to elect a member of the United States Senate to represent the Commonwealth of Massachusetts, concurrently with the 2020 U.S. presidential election, as well as elections to the United States Senate in other states, elections to the United States House of Representatives, and various state and local elections. On September 1, incumbent Senator Ed Markey defeated U.S. Representative Joe Kennedy III in a competitive primary for the Democratic nomination, and Kevin O'Connor defeated Shiva Ayyadurai for the Republican nomination. Markey went on to win the general election with 66.2% of the vote, and was thus re-elected to a second full term in a landslide.

Democratic primary
The state primary election took place on September 1, 2020. Incumbent Senator Ed Markey was challenged by U.S. Representative Joe Kennedy III, a member of the Kennedy family. Kennedy and Markey had similar political positions, both being considered reliably liberal Democrats, though Markey was considered more left-wing on the DW-Nominate scale. An elected senator had not been defeated in a primary since Richard Lugar in 2012, and an elected Democrat had not been defeated since Joe Lieberman in 2006.

In August 2019, it was reported that Kennedy was considering a primary challenge to Markey. He announced that he would be launching a campaign on September 18. According to Vox, one of the main reasons for Kennedy's decision to challenge Markey, rather than waiting for a Senate seat to open up, was that Markey was perceived to be an easier opponent than the raft of candidates that would run without an incumbent. Polling of the potential match-up showed Markey trailing Kennedy by as much as 14 points, leading to speculation that he would retire rather than face a humiliating primary defeat, but he resolved to run for re-election.

Kennedy's campaign pitch largely focused around a message that he would "show up" for disadvantaged residents of Massachusetts, something he claimed Markey had not been doing. This strategy was heavily inspired by Ayanna Pressley's successful campaign for the U.S. House the previous cycle, and was aimed at casting Kennedy as an insurgent outsider running against the establishment.

Facing a severe polling deficit, Markey undertook to politically reinvent himself; his relatively low profile in Massachusetts gave him the opportunity to essentially define himself for the first time to many voters. The main focus of Markey's re-election strategy was to promote himself as a left-wing iconoclast who clashed with the Democratic Party apparatus; to this extent a campaign ad from 1976 wherein Markey promoted his clashes with Massachusetts political bosses was widely used by his campaign. Markey also frequently promoted an endorsement he received from New York Congresswoman Alexandria Ocasio-Cortez, a favorite of the Democratic Party's left; Ocasio-Cortez's endorsement encouraged left-wing activist organizations to also support Markey, and resulted in the incumbent developing a large following on the internet.

Support from within the Democratic Party was divided. Markey received support from the DSCC, Senate minority leader Chuck Schumer, and DSCC chair Catherine Cortez Masto. He was also endorsed by key figures in the party's progressive wing, such as Ocasio-Cortez, fellow Massachusetts Senator Elizabeth Warren, and the youth-led Sunrise Movement. Kennedy received various endorsements from the House leadership, including Speaker Nancy Pelosi (which was noteworthy because speakers rarely endorse candidates in competitive primaries, especially challengers to incumbents), House Majority Leader Steny Hoyer, House Democratic Caucus chair Hakeem Jeffries, House Intelligence Committee chair Adam Schiff, and House Democratic Senior Chief Deputy Whip John Lewis.

As the campaign progressed, Markey began to explicitly criticise the Kennedy family, deeming them as emblematic of privilege, and frequently contrasting the Kennedy Compound with his own upbringing in Malden. Kennedy attacked Markey for these actions, accusing him of "weaponizing" the history of the Kennedy family. As the race entered its final days the contest began to assume an ideological meaning, with New York Magazines Gabriel Debendetti writing that the contest was viewed as a "fight for the soul of the national Democratic party", with both candidates claiming that a victory for them would be an affirmation of the strength of the left-wing of the Democrats.

Candidates

Nominee
Ed Markey, incumbent U.S. Senator

Eliminated in primary
Joe Kennedy III, U.S. Representative from Massachusetts' 4th congressional district, and grandson of former Attorney General and former U.S. Senator Robert F. Kennedy

Withdrawn
Washington Blask
Shannon Liss-Riordan, labor attorney
Steve Pemberton, chief human resources officer of Workhuman (endorsed Markey)
Allen Waters, perennial candidate (endorsed Kennedy)

Declined
Maura Healey, Massachusetts Attorney General
Scott Lang, former mayor of New Bedford (endorsed Kennedy)
Juana Matias, former state representative and candidate for Massachusetts's 3rd congressional district in 2018
Seth Moulton, former 2020 presidential candidate and incumbent U.S. Representative for Massachusetts's 6th congressional district (running for reelection)
Michelle Wu, Boston City Councilor

Endorsements

Polling

Debates 
 Complete video of debate, February 18, 2020 – C-SPAN
 Complete video of Markey-Kennedy debate, August 11, 2020 - C-SPAN

Results

Markey defeated his challenger, Joe Kennedy III. Markey won by running up big margins in Boston and its suburbs, and did well in Western Massachusetts, especially in college towns. Kennedy did well in the Cape Cod region, and won many Southern municipalities, especially his native 4th district. Markey's margin of victory of 10.8% was attributed to his unexpected strength among progressives and younger voters. Kennedy's loss marked the first time a member of the Kennedy family had lost an election in Massachusetts.

Republican primary
The state primary election took place on September 1, 2020.

Candidates

Nominee
Kevin O'Connor, attorney

Eliminated in primary
Shiva Ayyadurai, entrepreneur, conspiracy theorist, and independent candidate for the U.S. Senate in 2018 (Ran as an Independent (write-in) in the general election)

Declined
Charlie Baker, Governor of Massachusetts (endorsed O'Connor)

Results

Other candidates

Libertarian Party

Failed to qualify
Vermin Supreme, performance artist and political satirist; member of the Libertarian Party Judiciary Committee; former 2020 Libertarian presidential candidate (as a write-in candidate)

Results

Green Party

Withdrawn
Andre "Maha Visnu" Gray, Co-Chair of the Massachusetts Green-Rainbow Party, teacher, and businessman

Independents

Write-in candidate
 Shiva Ayyadurai (switched to this candidacy after losing Republican primary)

Withdrawn
 Frederick Mayock, independent candidate for Massachusetts' 1st congressional district in 2020

General election
The general election took place on November 3, 2020.

Predictions

Endorsements

Polling

with Charlie Baker

Results 

Markey won all fourteen of Massachusetts' counties for the second election in a row.

See also
 2020 Massachusetts general election

Notes
General

 Partisan clients

References

Further reading

External links

 
 
  (State affiliate of the U.S. League of Women Voters)
 

Official campaign websites
 Ed Markey (D) for Senate
 Kevin O'Connor (R) for Senate

2020
Massachusetts
United States Senate